Pachakili (பச்சக்கிளி) is a 2022 Indian-Tamil-language Family drama television series, starring Monisha Arshak, Kishore and Stalin Muthu in main roles. It premiered on Colors Tamil on 4 July 2022 and ended on 9 December 2022, and aired on Monday to Friday at 19:30 and available for streaming in selected markets on Voot.

Plot
That deals with is a smart and charming girl Pachakili and Divorce lawyer Adithya are focuses on how the two individuals come together under one roof despite their contrary ideologies on family and marriages.

Cast

Main
 Monisha Arshak as Pachakili
 Is a smart and charming woman, one of the younger sister of three brothers Meenakshi Sundaram, Azhagar and Velu. She is values her relationships and is willing to go to any length to protect them. 
 Kishore – Adithya
 Is a Divorce lawyer Adithya who doesn’t value familial ties nor nuptial bonds.

Supporting
 Stalin Muthu as Meenakshi Sundaram
 Is a warm heart person and elder brother of Azhagar, Velu and Pachakili.
 Vijay Anand as Azhagar
 Ashwin Kumar as Velu

Production

Casting
Actress Monisha Arshak was selected to play Pachakili's character who last appeared in 2022 TV series Naam Iruvar Namakku Iruvar 2 has received offer to appear in the series. Kishore was selected to play male protagonist opposite Actress Monisha Arshak. he is making their debut with the series. While Stalin Muthu, Vijay Anand and Ashwin Kumar were also selected for supporting roles.

Release
The first promo was unveiled on 9 June 2022, featuring The series name. The second promo was unveiled on 15 June 2022, featuring the protagonists and revealing the release date.

References

External links 
 

Colors Tamil original programming
Tamil-language legal television series
2022 Tamil-language television series debuts
Tamil-language television shows
Television shows set in Tamil Nadu
2022 Tamil-language television series endings